Nutscale Reservoir is a reservoir located in Exmoor in north west Somerset, England. It supplies the town of Minehead and nearby Porlock and Porlock Weir. The reservoir is part of the River Horner catchment area, and is dammed.

The reservoir was built in 1942, to hold . This was intended to relieve summer droughts in Minehead.  It typically provides good quality water, although high levels of geosmin were recorded in 2008. To manage the effects of this on tap water systems were developed to remove this reservoir from the drinking water supply when necessary and flush the pipe carrying the water.

The fishing rights to the reservoir are owned by the National Trust, as part of its Holnicote Estate, and leased out privately.

References

Exmoor
Reservoirs in Somerset